Brandon Moss (born May 12, 1984) is an American former soccer player who last played for the Columbus Crew of Major League Soccer.

Moss played for the Classic FC Bandidos where he won 3 regional championships.  Moss played college soccer at the University of New Mexico, where he started in 83 matches from 2002 to 2005. He also played in the USL Premier Development League for both Boulder Rapids Reserve and Chicago Fire Premier.

He was drafted in the third round, 27th overall, by the Columbus Crew in the 2006 MLS SuperDraft and played 20 games for the Crew during his rookie season.

He announced his retirement in January 2008. He joined as an voluntary assistant at Ohio State University in August 2009 after his retirement

Moss re-joined the University of New Mexico program an assistant coach from 2010 to 2014.

References

1984 births
Living people
American soccer players
Colorado Rapids U-23 players
Chicago Fire U-23 players
Columbus Crew players
New Mexico Lobos men's soccer players
USL League Two players
Major League Soccer players
Columbus Crew draft picks
Soccer players from Albuquerque, New Mexico
Association football midfielders
Ohio State Buckeyes men's soccer coaches
New Mexico Lobos men's soccer coaches